Autodectis is a genus of moth in the family Gelechiidae. It contains the species Autodectis atelarga, which is found in South Africa.

The wingspan is about 24 mm. The forewings are shining ochreous-white, without markings. The hindwings are shining ochreous-white.

References

Endemic moths of South Africa
Apatetrinae
Taxa named by Edward Meyrick
Monotypic moth genera
Moths of Africa